Anna Keaveney (born Ann Keaveney, 5 October 1949, Runcorn, Cheshire, England – 20 November 2004, aged 55) was an English actress best known for her role as Marie Jackson in the Channel 4 soap opera Brookside. She also appeared in an episode of Birds of a Feather as a  Green Party election candidate.

She appeared in the films Shirley Valentine, The 51st State and in several other TV series including Ali G Indahouse, Gimme Gimme Gimme, Emmerdale, Footballer's Wives, and Peak Practice. Keaveney had a small part as Nellie in Mike Leigh's Vera Drake and a further role as Rose Pickering in Where the Heart Is. In 1998 she also played Kitty Dodds in the 24th episode of the seventh series of Heartbeat. In 2004 she made her final film appearance as Mrs. Bain in Asylum which was released in 2005 after she died.

Death
She died of lung cancer in 2004, aged 55.

Selected filmography

References

External links

1949 births
2004 deaths
English soap opera actresses
English film actresses
Deaths from lung cancer in England
Place of death missing
People from Runcorn
Actresses from Cheshire
20th-century English actresses
21st-century English actresses
20th-century British businesspeople